Thutmose IV (sometimes read as Thutmosis or Tuthmosis IV, Thothmes in older history works in Latinized Greek;  "Thoth is born") was the 8th Pharaoh of the 18th Dynasty of Egypt, who ruled in approximately the 14th century BC. His prenomen or royal name, Menkheperure, means "Established in forms is Re." He was the son of Amenhotep II and Tiaa.

Life

Thutmose IV was born to Amenhotep II and Tiaa, but was not actually the crown prince and Amenhotep II's chosen successor to the throne. Some scholars speculate that Thutmose ousted his older brother in order to usurp power and then commissioned the Dream Stele in order to justify his unexpected kingship. Thutmose's most celebrated accomplishment was the restoration of the Great Sphinx of Giza and subsequent commission of the Dream Stele. According to Thutmose's account on the Dream Stele, while the young prince was out on a hunting trip, he stopped to rest under the head of the Sphinx, which was buried up to the neck in sand. He soon fell asleep and had a dream in which the Sphinx told him that if he cleared away the sand and restored it he would become the next pharaoh. After completing the restoration of the Sphinx, he placed a carved stone tablet, now known as the Dream Stele, between the two paws of the Sphinx. The restoration of the Sphinx, and the text of the Dream Stele would then be a piece of propaganda on Thutmose's part, meant to bestow legitimacy upon his unexpected kingship. 

Little is known about his brief ten-year rule. He suppressed a minor uprising in Nubia in his 8th year (attested in his Konosso stela) around 1393 BC and was referred to in a stela as the Conqueror of Syria, but little else has been pieced together about his military exploits. Betsy Bryan, who penned a biography of Thutmose IV, says that Thutmose IV's Konosso stela appears to refer to a minor desert patrol action on the part of the king's forces to protect certain gold-mine routes in Egypt's Eastern Desert from occasional attacks by the Nubians. Thutmose IV's rule is significant because he established peaceful relations with Mitanni and married a Mitannian princess to seal this new alliance. Thutmose IV's role in initiating contact with Egypt's former rival, Mitanni, is documented by Amarna letter EA 29 composed decades later by Tushratta, a Mittanian king who ruled during the reign of Akhenaten, Thutmose IV's grandson. Tushratta states to Akhenaten that:

Dates and length of reign

Dating the beginning of the reign of Thutmose IV is difficult to do with certainty because he is several generations removed from the astronomical dates which are usually used to calculate Egyptian chronologies, and the debate over the proper interpretation of these observances has not been settled. Thutmose's grandfather Thutmose III almost certainly acceded the throne in either 1504 or 1479, based upon two lunar observances during his reign, and ruled for nearly 54 years. His successor Amenhotep II, Thutmose IV's father, took the throne and ruled for at least 26 years but has been assigned up to 35 years in some chronological reconstructions. The currently preferred reconstruction, after analyzing all this evidence, usually comes to an accession date around 1401 BC or 1400 BC for the beginning of Thutmose IV's reign.

The length of his reign is not clear. He is usually given about nine or ten years of reign.  Manetho credits him a reign of 9 years and 8 months. However, Manetho's other figures for the 18th Dynasty are frequently assigned to the wrong kings or simply incorrect, so monumental evidence is also used to determine his reign length. Of all of Thutmose IV's dated monuments, three date to his first regnal year, one to his fourth, possibly one to his fifth, one to his sixth, two to his seventh, and one to his eighth. Two other dated objects, one dated to a Year 19 and another year 20, have been suggested as possibly belonging to him, but neither have been accepted as dating to his reign. The readings of the king's name in these dates are today accepted as referring to the prenomen of Thutmose III—Menkheperre—and not Menkhepe[ru]re Thutmose IV himself. Due to the absence of higher dates for Thutmose IV after his Year 8 Konosso stela, Manetho's figures here are usually accepted. There were once chronological reconstructions which gave him a reign as long as 34–35 years. Today, however, most scholars ascribe him a 10-year reign from 1401 to 1392 BC, within a small margin of error.

Monuments

Like most of the Thutmoside kings, he built on a grand scale. Thutmose IV called it the tekhen waty or 'unique obelisk.' It was transported to the grounds of the Circus Maximus in Rome by Emperor Constantius II in 357 AD and, later, "re-erected by Pope Sixtus V in 1588 at the Piazza San Giovanni" where it is today known as the Lateran Obelisk.

Thutmose IV also built a unique chapel and peristyle hall against the back or eastern walls of the main Karnak temple building. The chapel was intended for people "who had no right of access to the main [Karnak] temple. It was a 'place of the ear' for the god Amun where the god could hear the prayers of the townspeople." This small alabaster chapel and peristyle hall of Thutmose IV has today been carefully restored by French scholars from the Centre Franco-Egyptien D'Étude des Temple de Karnak (CFEETK) mission in Karnak.

Burial and mummy 

Thutmose IV was buried in tomb KV43 the Valley of the Kings but his body was later moved to the mummy cache in KV35, where it was discovered by Victor Loret in 1898. An examination of his mummy conducted by Grafton Elliot Smith revealed that he was extremely emaciated at the time of his death. His height was given as  but considering that the feet have been broken off post-mortem, his height in life would have been taller. The forearms are crossed over the chest, right over left. His ears are also pierced. Elliot Smith estimated his age to be 25–28 years or possibly older. He was succeeded to the throne by his son, Amenhotep III.

In 1980, James Harris and Edward F. Wente conducted X-ray examinations of New Kingdom Pharaoh's crania and skeletal remains, which included the mummified remains of Thutmose IV. The authors determined that the royal mummies of the 18th Dynasty bore strong similarities to contemporary Nubians with slight differences. 

In 2012 a surgeon at Imperial College London analysed the early death of Thutmose IV and the premature deaths of other Eighteenth Dynasty pharaohs (including Tutankhamun and Akhenaten). He concludes that their early deaths were likely as a result of a familial temporal epilepsy. This would account for both the untimely death of Thutmose IV and also his religious vision described on the Dream Stele, due to this type of epilepsy's association with intense spiritual visions and religiosity.

His mummy has the inventory number CG 61073. In April 2021 his mummy was moved from the Museum of Egyptian Antiquities to the National Museum of Egyptian Civilization along with those of 17 other kings and 4 queens in an event termed the Pharaohs' Golden Parade.

Gallery

See also
 History of Ancient Egypt

References

Sources

Further reading
 C.N. Reeves, Tuthmosis IV as 'great-grandfather' of Tut῾ankhamun, in: Göttinger Miszellen 56 (1982), 65-69.

 
15th-century BC births
14th-century BC deaths
15th-century BC Pharaohs
14th-century BC Pharaohs
Pharaohs of the Eighteenth Dynasty of Egypt
Ancient Egyptian mummies
Year of birth unknown
Children of Amenhotep II